Myrciaria guaquiea, commonly known as  or , is a species of plant in the family Myrtaceae. It is an evergreen shrub or small tree, endemic to the east of Brazil. The plant grows up to between 4 and 7 metres tall, and produces edible yellow fruits between 20 and 25mm in diameter. Consumed raw, the fruit has been described as tasting similar to Myrciaria glazioviana.

References

guaquiea
Crops originating from the Americas
Tropical fruit
Flora of South America
Endemic flora of Brazil
Fruits originating in South America
Cauliflory
Fruit trees
Berries